Kreshnik Xhelilaj (born 5 March 1983) known professionally as Nik Xhelilaj, is an Albanian actor. 

He began his international career with the movie The Sorrow of Mrs. Schneider, directed by Piro Milkani and Eno Milkani and was the leading actor in three critically acclaimed Albanian films, of which two entered in the List of Albanian submissions for the Academy Award for Best Foreign Language Film in 2008 and 2009. Nik has collected several "Best Actor" Awards in various international film festivals.

Biography

Nik Xhelilaj was born in Tirana, on 5 March 1983 in a family originally from south Albania, his father was born in Vlorë and his mother was born in Tepelenë.  
Both of his parents are high military officers by profession. Thus, at the age of 14, also thanks to his father's interest, he went to Istanbul to follow the military high-school. But his new path did not last more than 7 months and he decided to give up on the pursuit of the military career and to come back to Albania.
Eventually he engaged with other young artists into the "Sirea Film" projects, with movie directors Leonard Bombaj and Alfred Trebicka, who advised him to compete and sign up for the Fine Arts Academy. Firstly Nik was a candidate for the Faculty of Law, where he did not win.

Then, in 2004, at the age of 21, he entered the Fine Arts Academy for acting.
In 2005, after just having finished his freshman year, Nik was chosen by the experienced movie director Pirro Milkani to play the leading role of Lekë Seriani in the film The Sorrow of Mrs. Schneider, which had strong autobiographical elements. The plot itself dealt in general with the life of director Milkani in the 1960s, during his studies in then-Czechoslovakia. Even though he didn't know the Czech language at all, the young actor memorized and learned to pronounce his Czech lines for the entire film. Nik appeared nude in shower scene in this film. Also it was here that he became widely known with his stage name or nickname Nik, since the producers of the film found it hard to pronounce the Albanian name Kreshnik and thus suggested a shorter version of it. The movie was released in 2008 and was the Albanian submission of the Academy Award for Best Foreign Language Film for that year, but failed to be nominated.

Dancing with the Stars
Xhelilaj was part of the first season of the reality show Dancing with the Stars (Albania), that was held between 18 February and 7 May 2010. The couple of the actor and the professional dancer Olta Ahmetaj was the fifth to be eliminated from the competition (out of 12 couples) and thus resigning from the first prize of €50,000.

Filmography

Theatre
 Këmbanat e Muzgut - National Theatre, 2007Directors: Alfred Bualioti, Andon QesariLeading role: Lieutenant Llukan
 A Streetcar Named Desire (play) by Tennessee Williams - Academy of Arts of Albania, 2007Director: Timo FllokoLeading role: Stanley Kovalsky
 Tango (drama) by Slavomir Mrozek - Theater "Aleksandër Moisiu", Durrës, 2008Director: Driada DervishiLeading role: Arthur

References

External links
 
 Video of the Interview with Nik Xhelilaj at Top-Channel TV (in Albanian): E Diell, 31 October 2010 – Pjesa 4

Albanian male film actors
People from Tirana
1983 births
Living people
University of Arts (Albania) alumni
21st-century Albanian male actors
Albanian male stage actors